Fique is a natural fibre that grows in the leaves of plants in the genus Furcraea. Common names include fique, cabuya, pita, penca, penco, maguey, cabui, chuchao and coquiza.

History
The Indigenous peoples of the Americas extracted and used the fique fibers to make garments, ropes, and hammocks—among many things—for several centuries before the arrival of Spanish conquerors.

In the 17th century, Dutch colonists carried the plant from their Brazilian colonies in Pernambuco to the island of Mauritius.

The fibre was also introduced to St. Helena, India, Sri Lanka, Algeria, Madagascar, East Africa, Mexico and Costa Rica.

In the 18th century, in Dagua, Valle del Cauca, Colombia, the priest Feliciano Villalobos started the first rope and wrapping materials manufacturing industry; his products were made of fique. In 1880 the Colombian government reported a yearly production of three million kilograms of fibres, the exportation to Venezuela of two million, the fabrication of five millions pairs of alpargatas and four million metres of rope.

Between 1970 and 1975 the fique industry suffered a crisis brought about by the development of polypropylene, which costs less and is produced faster.

Today, fique is considered the Colombian national fibre and is used in the fabrication of ethnic products, Colombian handicrafts and recently (since July 2007) has been used for the heat protectors (handmade in Barichara) placed around the Colombian coffee cups sold in the Juan Valdez coffee shops worldwide.

Uses
Packing: The main use of the Colombian cabuya is for the fabrication of sacks and packages for agriculture. According with the number of threads, the products are classified as:
Dense: 6000 to 10,000 threads per square metre.  Used for flour and small grains such rice.
Semidense: 4800 to 5500. Used for bigger grains such coffee and beans.
Loose: 300 to 360. Used for fruits, vegetables and panela.
Ropes: with cabuya one can make very resistant ropes and strings of different calibres, from threads to manilas one inch in diameter.  Such ropes are used in the industries of transportation, construction, sailing and many others.
Arriería accessories: many of the elements used in the pack animals, such as enjalmas, cinchas, retrancas, lazos, pretales, tapa de enjalma, and cinchos are handmade with fique.
Tapestry: the mixed and crude cabuya is used in rugs and tapestry of different size and quality. The fibres can be stained with different organic materials, such as avocado seed, achiote and eucalyptus cortex.
Others: handcrafts, purses, bags, handbags, mattresses, curtains, shoes, umbrellas, baskets and many other products.

Subproducts 

Pulp: Used to produce organic fertilizer and paper
Leaves juice: Can be used for fabrication of soap, fungicides, alcoholic beverages (homemade tapetusa), organic fuel and animal food.
Floral stem: The strong floral stem of the fique plant is used in the construction of houses and ladders.
Bulbs: The pickled terminal bulbs of the plant are edible.
Medicinal uses: Peasants use the leaves in topic preparations for treatment of boils. The extract of leaves is used against horse lice.

Cultivation

The fique can be obtained from several species of Furcraea, such as F. macrophylla Baker, cabuya Trel, andina Trel, and castilla.  Depending on the processing of the fiber and the species used, many varieties of fique fibers can be obtained.  Among others:

Main varieties 
Ceniza (ash-colored)
Espinosa (rough texture)
Castilla or Golden border
Sisal

Secondary varieties 
Cabuya verde (green)
Uña de águila (eagle nail)
Negra común (black common)
Chachagueña
Genoia
Tunosa común (common spiked)
Jardineña
Espadilla
Rabo de chucha (opossum tail).

Optimal conditions for the growing of the fique plant are:

Temperature: 19 °C – 23 °C
Altitude: 1,300 m – 1,900 m
Annual rainfall: 1,000 mm – 1,600 mm
Sunlight: 5–6 hours/day
Soil: dry, rich in silicates.

Fique crops bring nitrogen to the soil, improving its fertility.  The plant is very adaptable to different ecological conditions. A fique plant can produce 1 to 6 kg of fiber each year.

Diseases

Llaga macana or rayadilla: a viral disease that attacks all varieties of fique and all the parts of the plant, especially in crops over 1900 m altitude.  The disease has no chemical control.  It must be managed with preventive measures.
Pink disease: caused by the fungus Erythricium salmonicolor.  The disease damages the leaves, disrupting the fibers. Treatment is undertaken with copper-based fungicides.  Peasants treat this disease by applying ashes to the base of the leaves.
Leaf cochineal (Diaspis bromelia): caused by a parasitic insect.
Leaf beetle: a beetle that perforates the base of the leaves.

References

Furcraea
Fiber plants
Biodegradable materials
Cellulose
Crops originating from Colombia
Crops originating from Ecuador
Crops originating from Peru
Crops originating from South America
Colombian culture
Garden plants of South America
Plants described in 1915